Higginbotham is an independent insurance brokerage firm founded in 1948 that provides businesses and individuals with insurance, risk management and employee benefit services.

In addition to its headquarters in Fort Worth, Texas, Higginbotham operates more than 20 offices across the state with approximately 800 employees. The firm ranks as the nation’s 31st largest independent insurance brokerage firm based on 2015 revenue.

History
Paul C. Higginbotham founded his namesake agency in 1948 after returning from military service in World War II. It started as a small personal insurance brokerage firm in Paul’s Riverside neighborhood of Fort Worth, Texas.

Paul’s nephew, Bill Stroud, purchased the agency in 1962 from his aunt who inherited it when Paul died. Between 1968 and 1983, the firm moved four times to more central locations in Fort Worth to attract an increasingly diverse clientele.

In 1986, Bill hired Rusty Reid from American General Fire and Casualty Company to broker commercial insurance at Higginbotham. Three years later, Rusty became president and CEO at age 27. He implemented an employee ownership model to engage and reward employees in the company’s growth and established the firm’s Financial Services division to begin offering employee benefits.

Higginbotham’s first geographic expansion occurred in 1998 with the opening of a second office in Dallas and was followed by several others in North and Central Texas. Then in 2007, the firm initiated an aggressive statewide growth strategy, merging with likeminded independent agencies that support its business model. Through mergers, Higginbotham has expanded its footprint to more than 20 offices spanning Texas.

Of the 100 largest brokers of U.S. business, Higginbotham is the largest based in Texas by revenue.

Products and services
Property Insurance 
Casualty Insurance 
Home Insurance
Auto Insurance
Umbrella Insurance
Professional Liability Insurance
Risk Management
Employee Benefits
Benefits Administration
Retirement Plans
Executive Compensation
Life Insurance

Locations 
Arlington
Austin
Corpus Christi
Dallas
Fort Worth
Friendswood
Granbury
Houston
Lubbock
Lufkin
McAllen
McKinney
Mount Pleasant
Odessa
Port Arthur
Portland
San Antonio
Tyler
Victoria
Waco
Weatherford
Wichita Falls

Mergers and acquisitions
2016 Davis Insurance Agency
2016 AmeriCap Insurance Group
2016 Capps Insurance Agency
2016 Joe N. Pratt Insurance
2015 Commercial Global Insurance
2015 Mark Conner HOA Group
2015 Aycock & Fowler
2014 Willis of Texas
2014 Edgmon Insurance 
2014 Talon Insurance Agency
2013 Safe Harbor Benefits 
2013 Capital Benefits Group
2013 Chapman Schewe
2012 Coastal Insurance Group 
2012 BenefitSpecialists
2012 Byron Johnson Group
2010 Swantner & Gordon 
2010 William Gammon Insurance 
2010 The Essential Insurance Group, LLC
2009 Sunbelt Insurance Agency
2009 McKinney Insurance Group
2008 Allred-Thompson-Mason-Daugherty
2008 Madison Benefits Group

Community involvement
The Higginbotham Community Fund is a donor advised fund that was created in 2010 in partnership with the North Texas Community Foundation. Grants are distributed to nonprofits throughout Texas that are recommended by employees and selected by a Higginbotham advisory committee. The fund is financed by employee donations and pledges with a corporate matching component. As of August 31, 2016, the fund has raised $1,038,613 through employee donations and pledges and granted $764,946.

Honors and awards 
Higginbotham has been recognized as an A+ accredited business by the Better Business Bureau of Fort Worth since March 1, 1990
Rank #31 in the Business Insurance 2016 list of 100 Largest Brokers of U.S. Business based on 2015 revenue
 Rank #33 of the largest U.S. employee benefit brokers in a list published by Employee Benefit Advisor and Employee Benefit News
 Rank #24 in the Insurance Journal 2016 list of the top 100 property/casualty agencies
 Rank #10 in the Business Insurance 2013 Best Places to Work in Insurance
 April 2011 Rough Notes Marketing Agency of the Month
 Higginbotham was one of 35 independent brokers featured on the 2014 inaugural list of Elite Agencies published by Insurance Business America
2014 Best Agency to Work For – South Central by Insurance Journal
2015 Dallas Business Journal Best Places to Work in DFW
2015-2016 Dallas Business Journal Healthiest Employers in North Texas
2015-2016 Austin Business Journal Healthiest Employers of Central Texas
17th Best Company to Work for in Texas in the large employer category of a list published by Best Companies Group in 2016
Named a Platinum Level Fit-Friendly Worksite by the American Heart Association of Tarrant County in 2015 and 2016
Received the Worksite Innovation Award from the American Heart Association of Tarrant County for our wellness program in 2016

References

Financial services companies established in 1948
Insurance companies based in Texas
Risk management companies